Li Xianji (born 20 September 1965) is a Chinese wrestler. He competed in the men's freestyle 62 kg at the 1988 Summer Olympics.

References

External links
 

1965 births
Living people
Chinese male sport wrestlers
Olympic wrestlers of China
Wrestlers at the 1988 Summer Olympics
Place of birth missing (living people)